The Paengmu Line is a partially electrified narrow gauge line of the Korean State Railway running from Paeg'am on the Paektusan Ch'ŏngnyŏn Line to Musan on the Musan Line, in the Ryanggang and North Hamgyŏng provinces of North Korea.

The electrified section originally ran  from Paeg'am Ch'ŏngnyŏn station to Yugok, whence the remaining  to the terminus at Musan remained unelectrified. Since the closure of part of the line due to the construction of a reservoir, the line has been split into two disconnected sections, the electrified Paeg'am—Kulsong and the non-electrified Ch'ŏnsu—Musan sections. A new standard gauge section from Paeg'am to Taet'aek, roughly paralleling the narrow-gauge line, was built in 2013.

History 
In 1927, the Government-General of Korea formulated a "12-Year Plan for Railways in Chosen", under which the railway network of the Korean Peninsula was to be greatly expanded. Although not part of that 12-year plan, it was decided to build the Paengmu Line for the transport of forest products and to aid in the development of the area. Construction was started at Paeg'am' by the Chosen Government Railway on 16 November 1932, and the first section, from Paeg'am to San'yangdae, was opened in September 1934. The line was extended to Yŏn'am in September of the following year and to Yup'yŏngdong in October 1936. Service on the Yup'yŏngdong—Yŏnsa section began in October 1939, but the final section to Musan, connecting the line to the Musan Line, was completed only in December 1944.

The names of several stations were changed over the years following the establishment of the DPRK, with Paeg'am Station becoming Paeg'am Ch'ŏngnyŏn Station, Hambuk Sinjang Station becoming Sinjang Station (this station was subsequently closed), Hambuk Mun'am Station becoming Tuam Station, and Sinyang Station becoming Samyu Station. Electrification of the section from Paeg'am to Yugok was completed in August 1991.

In August 1980, Kim Il-sung ordered the construction of a new, northern east-west transversal line to run from Manp'o on the Manp'o Line to Hoeryŏng on the Hambuk Line. The Pukpu Line, as the planned line was called (북부, pukpu, means "northern"), was to have been built in three stages: Manp'o to Hyesan, Hyesan to Musan, and Musan to Hoeryŏng; to save on labour and expenditures, the new line was to make use of existing rail lines where possible - the Hŭngam–Musan section of the Paengmu Line was to have been regauged. However, this plan was only partially realised before it was abandoned in the 1990s. The plans were revived again in the mid-2000s, and work began on the second stage, in the form of the shortening and regauging of the Samjiyŏn Line from Hyesan to Motka. Work stopped and started several times, until finally work on the Hyesan–Motka section was completed in April 2017, but the plans to continue construction of the line to Musan are not currently being pursued.

Construction of the reservoir of the Paektusan Sŏngun Youth Power Station led to the flooding of part of the line, resulting in the closure of the section between Ch'ŏnsu and Kulsong; since the closure, the line is electrified only between Paeg'am and Kulsong.

Construction of the line took place as follows:

Route 
An orange background in the "Distance" box indicates that section of the line is not electrified narrow-gauge; a pink background indicates that section is electrified narrow gauge. The Paegam—Taet'aek section is duplicated by an incomplete electrified standard gauge.

References 

 Japanese Government Railways (1937), 鉄道停車場一覧. 昭和12年10月1日現在(The List of the Stations as of 1 October 1937), Kawaguchi Printing Company, Tokyo, pp 502–503

Railway lines in North Korea
Standard gauge railways in North Korea
2 ft 6 in gauge railways in North Korea